The Dairy Development Authority (DDA) is a government agency of Uganda, responsible for the provision of dairy development and regulatory services to promote increased, sustainable milk production and consumption and the attainment of a profitable dairy industry sector, increased economic development and improved nutritional status of Ugandans.

Location
The headquarters of the agency are located at 1 Kafu Road, on  Nakasero Hill, in the Central Division of Kampala, the capital and largest city in Uganda. The coordinates of the agency headquarters are: 0°19'34.0"N, 32°34'59.0"E (Latitude:0.326111; Longitude:32.583056). The agency maintains a branch office in the western Ugandan city of Mbarara and an analytical laboratory in the Lugogo neighborhood of Kampala.

Overview
The DDA was established in 2000, by Act of Parliament, with the objective of providing proper coordination and efficient implementation of all government policies which are designed to achieve and maintain self-sufficiency in the production of milk in Uganda. It is closely affiliated with the Uganda Ministry of Agriculture, Animal Industry and Fisheries.

Departments
The agency is administered under three departments:

 Dairy Development Department 
 Regulatory Services Department 
 Finance and Administration Department

See also
Economy of Uganda
Agriculture in Uganda

References

External links
Website of Dairy Development Authority

Organisations based in Kampala
Government agencies of Uganda
Economy of Uganda
Organizations established in 2000
2000 establishments in Uganda
Dairy farming in Uganda
Kampala Central Division